Norma O'Hara Murphy is an Australian country music singer and songwriter. Her album Closer Now was nominated for ARIA Award for Best Country Album at the ARIA Music Awards of 1991. In 1989 she was inducted into the Australian Country Music Hands of Fame. She has won five Golden Guitars.

Biography
Norma O'Hara Murphy was born and raised in the Murray Valley region of Victoria. Her mother's family were pioneers of the area. She is a third generation Irish/Australian.

1982-1987: Career beginnings
In 1982, O'Hara Murphy recorded her debut album in Coffs Harbour. Rodeo Queen was released on the Country Records Label and was a finalist in the Country Music Awards of Australia (CMAA).

In 1985, O'Hara Murphy recorded her second studio album in Sydney. Vanishing Horsemen, was released on the Selection Records label. In 1986, she won her first Golden Guitar for "How the Firequeen Crossed the Swamp" and the Tamworth Songwriting Association Award for "Stumpy". In 1987, O'Hara Murphy released River Gums & Mallee Dust.

1988-1999: Continued success and ARIA nomination
In 1988, O'Hara Murphy signed with Festival Records and wrote and produced her fourth studio album, Colours, released in 1989. In 1990, Closer Now was released. At the ARIA Music Awards of 1991, the album was nominated for ARIA Award for Best Country Album. In August 1991, the compilation Norma's Best was released featuring the single "The Banks of the Bogan", which peaked at number 147 on the ARIA Chart. The album peaked at number 132 on the ARIA Chart.

In 1992, O'Hara Murphy recorded Winds of Change at Enrec Studio. Her sixth studio album was released in 1993. The song "Barbwire & Bamboo" was nominated for a golden guitar in the heritage category, while "Tamworth (the song)" won O'Hara Murphy the Golden Guitar for Best Female Vocal Award.

In 1995 O'Hara Murphy moved to Larrikin Records and recorded her seventh studio album, Sweet Rain. In 1999 she produced and released the live album, Live in Bundaberg, through her own label Gumleaf Music. The album was recorded at The Brothers Club with Bundaberg musicians. Shortly after O'Hara Murphy took a break from recording.

2000-present: Break and return to music, The Celtic Connection
The beginning of the twentieth century O'Hara Murphy concentrated more on writing. She wrote and produced another two Golden Guitars winning songs, performed by Slim Dusty in 2001 and 2003.

In 2010, O'Hara Murphy returned to the recording studio and released Whiskey Gully Road on Bony Mountain Music. The title track was a finalist in the 2011 QMusic Awards. "Goin' For Glory" won the Stan Coster Bush Ballad Songwriting Award.

In 2011 O'Hara Murphy released her ninth studio album, The Celtic Connection (volume one) and she was a Finalist at the Celtic Awards in Glen Innes. A second Celtic Collection followed in 2013. In 2014, O'Hara Murphy won Australian Celtic Artist of the Year.

In October 2014, O'Hara Murphy released her eleventh studio album, Solid Gold, and was a return to country music. O'Hara Murphy was a finalist at the 2016 CMAA.

In 2017, O'Hara Murphy released Sweet Love.

In December 2019, O'Hara Murphy released her thirteenth studio album, Bloodlines. The album was nominated for Australian Celtic Awards in 2020.

Discography

Studio albums

Live albums

Compilation albums

Awards

ARIA Music Awards
The ARIA Music Awards is an annual awards ceremony that recognises excellence, innovation, and achievement across all genres of Australian music.

|-
| 1991
| Closer Now
| ARIA Award for Best Country Album
| 
|-

Country Music Awards of Australia
The Country Music Awards of Australia (CMAA) (also known as the Golden Guitar Awards) is an annual awards night held in January during the Tamworth Country Music Festival, celebrating recording excellence in the Australian country music industry. They have been held annually since 1973.
 (wins only)
|-
| 1986
| "How the Fire Queen Crossed the Swamp"
| Heritage Award
| 
|-
| 1989
| herself
| Hands of Fame
| 
|-
| 1991
| "Sarah's Memory"
| Female Vocalist of the Year
| 
|-
| 1993
| "Tamworth"
| Female Vocalist of the Year
| 
|-
| 2001
| "Paddy William" (performed by Slim Dusty, written by Norma O'Hara Murphy)
| Bush Ballad of the Year
| 
|-
| 2003
| "Just An Old Cattle Dog" (performed by Slim Dusty, written by Norma O'Hara Murphy)
| Bush Ballad of the Year
|

Tamworth Songwriters Awards
The Tamworth Songwriters Association (TSA) is an annual songwriting contest for original country songs, awarded in January at the Tamworth Country Music Festival. They commenced in 1986. Norma O'Hara Murphy won three awards in that time.
 (wins only)
|-
| 1986
| "Stumpy" by Norma Murphy
| New Songwriter Award
| 
|-
| 1992
| "Take a Cutting" by Norma O'Hara Murphy
| Comedy/ Novelty Song of the Year
| 
|-
| 1996
| Norma O'Hara Murphy
| Songmaker awards
| 
|-

References

Australian women singers
Living people
Australian people of Irish descent
Year of birth missing (living people)